Luca Fusi (born 7 June 1963) is an Italian former professional footballer turned manager, who played as a midfielder or defender. He is the current head coach of Lega Pro Seconda Divisione team Castel Rigone.

During his club career he played for Como, Sampdoria, Napoli, Torino and Juventus. He earned 8 caps for the Italy national football team and took part in the 1988 UEFA European Football Championship. He was known as an intelligent, hardworking, tactically versatile, and correct player throughout his career, with good technique and determination, and could also play as a sweeper, a role in which he was frequently deployed in his later career, following his athletic decline, due to his playmaking ability.

Club career 
Fusi began his career with Como, then playing for Sampdoria from 1986 to 1988, and also winning a Coppa Italia with the Genoan side.

In 1988, he left Sampdoria to join Napoli, winning a UEFA Cup in 1989 and a Serie A championship type in 1990. In June 1990, he successively left Napoli to become part of the Torino midfield. Ironically for him, he scored his only Serie A goal for Torino away to Napoli on 16 February 1992, a left-footed strike from outside the area. Having won another Coppa Italia title in 1993, also reaching the 1992 UEFA Cup final, he moved to crosstown rivals Juventus, where he won another Serie A title and a personal third Coppa Italia in 1995, although he began to be deployed less frequently when Lippi switched to a zonal marking defensive system, which did not feature a sweeper, and collected only 10 appearances in the league in total, and 18 in all competitions throughout the season. He ended his career with Swiss side AC Lugano, where he played from 1996 to 1997.

International career 
Fusi made his Italian national team debut on 31 March 1988 in Split, against Yugoslavia, as a substitute for Luigi De Agostini. He was also called up for Italy at UEFA Euro 1988 under manager Azeglio Vicini, but did not play in any of Italy's games during the tournament as the team reached the semi-finals. In total, Fusi made 8 appearances for Italy between 1988 and 1992.

Coaching career 
After two seasons as assistant coach at Cesena, in 2007–08 season, Fusi served as head coach of Bellaria Igea of Serie C2 (fourth tier).

In June 2008, he signed for Real Marcianise of Lega Pro Prima Divisione (third tier), guiding them to a mid-table finish. He is currently serving as head coach of Foligno, another Lega Pro Prima Divisione team, for the 2009–10 season. He was removed from his managerial duties on 27 April 2010 due to poor results, with Foligno in 15th place, and replaced by Salvatore Matrecano.

On 23 October 2013, Fusi became coach of Castel Rigone.

Honours

Club
Sampdoria
Coppa Italia: 1987–88

Napoli
Serie A: 1989–90
UEFA Cup: 1988–89

Torino
Mitropa Cup: 1991
Coppa Italia: 1992–93

Juventus
Serie A: 1994–95
Coppa Italia: 1994–95
Supercoppa Italiana: 1995
UEFA Champions League: 1995–96

References

External links
Career profile

Profile at FIGC.it  

1963 births
Living people
Sportspeople from Lecco
Italian footballers
Italian football managers
Association football midfielders
Association football defenders
Italy international footballers
UEFA Euro 1988 players
Italian expatriate footballers
Como 1907 players
U.C. Sampdoria players
S.S.C. Napoli players
Torino F.C. players
Juventus F.C. players
FC Lugano players
Serie A players
Serie B players
Expatriate footballers in Switzerland
A.C. Bellaria Igea Marina managers
UEFA Cup winning players
Footballers from Lombardy